Jarupan Kuldiloke (born 9 August 1973) is a Thai politician and political activist. She is daughter of Chut Kuldiloke.

Education 
Jarupan Kuldiloke graduated Bachelor's degree at Mahidol University and master's degree at University of Birmingham and Doctor of Philosophy at Humboldt University of Berlin.

Work 
Jarupan Kuldiloke was professor at Mahidol University since 2003 to 2009. She resigned in 2008 and She is Member of parliament of Pheu Thai Party.

Award 
 1998 - 2000 Doctoral Fellowship, EU-Commission on Food Technology Project, Berlin University of Technology
 1994 - 1995 Research Fellowship, The University of Birmingham, UK

Insignia 
 2013 -  Order of the White Elephant
 2012 -  Order of the Crown of Thailand
 
 2011 -  Order of the White Elephant

References

External links
 ผศ.  ดร. จารุพรรณ กุลดิลก 
 ผศ.ดร.จารุพรรณ กุลดิลก ดาวเด่น เสื้อแดง
 ดร.จารุพรรณ กุลดิลก ไพร่ดาวเด่น "ถ้ามีปฏิวัติอีกเราจะสู้จนตาย" 
 ผศ.ดร. จารุพรรณ กุลดิลก "ผู้ก่อการร้ายไม่ใช่คนเสื้อแดง"
 จารุพรรณ กุลดิลก, สัมภาษณ์พิเศษ, "หากเพื่อไทยได้เป็นรัฐบาล... จะไม่ทำลายกระบวนการยุติธรรม เพื่อเอาผิดคนๆ เดียว และระบบพรรคทั้งหมด"

Jarupan Kuldiloke
Living people
1973 births
Jarupan Kuldiloke
Jarupan Kuldiloke
Jarupan Kuldiloke
Jarupan Kuldiloke